Cmune is a Chinese software developer which was established in 2007. Cmune is the maker of UberStrike, a cross-platform computer game. Cmune has offices in Beijing, China and San Francisco, United States.

Developed initially under the name Paradise Paintball, the first-person shooter (FPS) Uberstrike is a casual and multiplayer free-to-play 3D browser game. As of November 2012, it was the largest FPS inside Facebook. It was also available on its own website, and on the App Store for Mac and iOS. The company was shut down later in 2020.

As of June 13, 2016, the game has been offline.

Recognition

On 28 May 2009, Paradise Paintball was selected as one of the winners Facebook fbFund 2009 program. The fbFund is run by Facebook, Accel Partners and The Founders Fund. Cmune was nominated for two Unity Awards: the Community Choice Award, which is chosen via poll, by users, and The Cross Platform Award.

Games 
Cmune has developed 3 games in total. UberStrike, DeadHeads and UltraHunt. The company also worked on PAYDAY: Crime War for a few months.

UberStrike was an online FPS for PC's and later becoming avaible on iOS. Game was shut down in 2016 but original website www.uberstrike.com is still up.

DeadHeads was an online FPS for Android and iOS. The game was shut down in around 2020. Website is still up to this day at deadheads.webflow.io

UltraHunt was a battle royale game for Android and iOS. It originated in 2018 and was in closed pre-alpha stage. Not so much is known about that game.

UberStrike 

Paradise Paintball was launched in November 2008. The game was ranked number 1 worldwide on Apple Dashboard for four months after its debut in November 2008 and was the first real-time 3D multiplayer game launched on Facebook and MySpace, where it was awarded "Best New App" at GDC in March 2010. Paradise Paintball was touted as the first 3D browser based game with real time micropayment systems, where users are able to purchase virtual goods without having to quit the game.

Paintball Paradise was renamed 'UberStrike' on November 16, 2010. The game also had a forum where every player could seek training, visit clan threads, sell signature art, etc. On April 13, 2016, Cmune announced the closing of Uberstrike through the game's website homepage   and the game servers were terminated on June 13, 2016.

In 2019, fans created a patch of the game. The game can be played without official Uberstrike servers. Link to the Discord server with installation instructions: https://discord.gg/hhxZCBamRT

DeadHeads 
DeadHeads was launched back in May 2017. It offered 12 weapons and lots of skins to them, 4 survivor characters (with each having own skins) and 5 infected characters (with each having own skins). There were 10 maps in total, with some being taken from UberStrike: Turbine, Transit, Outpost, New Hongkong, Lunar, Hangar, Ground Zero, Garrison, Basilica and Aqualab. This game had a discord server which is still up to this day and can be accessed from the official website. The game was shut down in 2020 with studio as well.

UltraHunt 
UltraHunt was launched in 2018 as closed pre-alpha. It was supposed to be a battle royale for Android and iOS devices. Website is still avaibale via ultrahunt.webflow.io . Very little is known about it as of 2022.

See also
Online gaming in China

Notes

 https://www.destructoid.com/paintball-3d-becomes-the-first-facebook-fps--170927.phtml
 http://www.polygon.com/2013/2/19/4006744/uberstrike-developers-planning-for-tablet-release

External links
CMUNE Home Page

Chinese companies established in 2007
Privately held companies of China
Video game companies of China